SS-GB is a 2017 British drama series produced for the BBC and based on the 1978 novel of the same name by Len Deighton. It is set in a 1941 alternative timeline in which the United Kingdom is occupied by Nazi Germany during the Second World War.

Background

In the alternative world, it is November 1941, nine months after a successful German invasion of Britain. Winston Churchill has been executed, and King George VI is a prisoner who has not been seen in public for some time. His queen, Elizabeth, and their daughters Elizabeth and Margaret have escaped. A British government in exile, led by Rear-Admiral Conolly, exists but is not recognised by the United States. Germany has also maintained friendly relations with the Soviet Union, and Soviet Foreign Minister Molotov has just flown in to oversee the removal of the body of Karl Marx to the Soviet Union.

Douglas Archer, a Scotland Yard murder squad Detective Superintendent with a stellar reputation, is working under a German superior from the Schutzstaffel's (SS) Security Service, the security force of the Nazi Party. Though his wife was killed by a German bombing raid in the Blitz, Archer avoids involvement in political crimes and views resistance to the Nazis as futile. A routine murder investigation becomes political when it appears to have been perpetrated by agents of the British Resistance. An aggressive SS officer arrives and takes control of the investigation, which is of interest to the SS because the victim may have possessed data from the German Army's programme to produce an atomic bomb. Archer also learns that his secretary and lover, Sylvia Manning, is a member of the British Resistance, and he is reluctantly drawn into a conspiracy against the Germans.

Production 
In November 2014, it was announced that the BBC had commissioned writers Neal Purvis and Robert Wade to adapt Len Deighton's novel SS-GB.

In August 2015, it was announced that Sam Riley was in talks to star in the lead role of Detective Superintendent Douglas Archer of Scotland Yard. Riley's casting was confirmed in late September 2015.

Production began in October 2015 and ended in January 2016. The series was produced by Sid Gentle Films Ltd. It was broadcast on BBC One in five one-hour episodes from 19 February 2017 and 19 March 2017.

The series filmed various scenes for episodes 1 to 4 at the Chatham Historic Dockyard in Kent. The location was used as a double for London streets and the mortuary that is featured in episode 1.

Cast 
 Sam Riley as Detective Superintendent Douglas Archer, a Scotland Yard detective in German-occupied London
 Kate Bosworth as Barbara Barga, an American reporter
 Rainer Bock as Gruppenführer Fritz Kellermann, the SS officer supervising the police force
 Aneurin Barnard as Police Constable Jimmy Dunn, a junior policeman working with Archer
 Christina Cole as Joyce Sheenan, Archer's neighbour who cares for his son and whose own husband is a prisoner-of-war
 Maeve Dermody as Sylvia Manning, Archer's secretary and lover
 Lars Eidinger as Standartenführer Oskar Huth, an SS officer newly arrived in London
 James Cosmo as Detective Sergeant Harry Woods, Archer's friend and co-worker
 Jason Flemyng as Colonel George Mayhew, a British aristocrat, former army officer and a leader of the British Resistance
 James Northcote as Dr John Spode, an atomic physicist working with the British Resistance
 Ronald Zehrfeld as Captain Hans Hesse
 Sam Kronis as Heinrich Himmler
 Kit Connor as Bob Sheenan

Episodes

Reception 
SS-GB received highly-positive reviews, with The Telegraph giving the series 4 out of 5 and saying that the "alt-history thriller deserves a follow-up series". The main criticisms were against the sound quality and the reportedly-inaudible dialogue for some viewers in the first episode, which the BBC offered to "look at" for future episodes.

The first episode achieved good ratings, with over 8.5 million viewers tuning in. However, as the series went on, ratings gradually fell, with only 3.5 million watching the final episode.

The review by The Guardian awarded three of five stars based on a viewing of the first two episodes. It commented that the series "holds up handsomely on the big screen, favouring film noir style over pulp content" but added that "it would be helpful to see more of the minutiae of London life under the Nazis, to get some fresh air after being confined to the corridors of power".

The series was released on DVD and BD on 10 July 2018; approximately a year later, the Rotten Tomatoes site showed a Critic's Consensus of 89% favourable and commented, "SS-GB is a convincingly wrought slice of hypothetical history, drenched in noir style and dense with moral quandaries".

See also 
 The Man in the High Castle
 Fatherland
 Philadelphia Experiment II
 An Englishman's Castle
 It Happened Here
 Hypothetical Axis victory in World War II

References

External links 
 
 
 
 

2017 British television series debuts
2017 British television series endings
2010s British drama television series
Alternate history television series
Fiction set in 1941
Television series about Nazis
Television series about Nazism
Television series about World War II alternate histories
2010s British television miniseries
Dystopian television series
BBC television dramas
BBC high definition shows
Television shows based on British novels
English-language television shows
Television shows set in London
Fictional invasions of England